Wang Gongliang (Chinese:王宫良; born December 14, 1989), born Wang Keda, is a Chinese singer, actor and model.

Filmography

Film

Television

References

1989 births
Living people
21st-century Chinese male actors
Male actors from Shanxi